Sustainable seafood is seafood that is caught or farmed in ways that consider the long-term vitality of harvested species and the well-being of the oceans, as well as the livelihoods of fisheries-dependent communities. It was first promoted through the sustainable seafood movement which began in the 1990s. This operation highlights overfishing and environmentally destructive fishing methods. Through a number of initiatives, the movement has increased awareness and raised concerns over the way our seafood is obtained.

Sustainable seafood is from either fished or farmed sources that can maintain or increase production in the future without jeopardizing the ecosystems from which it was acquired. The sustainable seafood movement has gained momentum as more people become aware of both overfishing and environmentally destructive fishing methods. Fish farming can also have negative environmental effects, such as the destruction of natural wetlands and marine pollution.

Importance

Marine environments are currently under immense pressure. Their problems primarily arise through anthropogenic causes, such as overfishing and environmental destruction. However, research suggests that fisheries are able to recover or stabilize their populations when responsible management and regulations are in place. Unfortunately, most seafood is obtained through "irresponsible fishing practices that continue to modify some marine ecosystem."  This has resulted in record depleted stocks. For example, "85 percent of the world’s fisheries are fished at or beyond their maximum sustainable limit."  Considering the rising global population and the pressure that it has, and will continue to exert on the Earth's resources, a more sustainable method of fishing is necessary if humans wish to utilize its natural abundance.

Sustainable Seafood Movement

The Sustainable Seafood Movement is an initiative born through the realization that the marine ecosystems of the world were being overexploited and destroyed. It began in the 1990s and was driven by social marketing through Ecolabel and awareness campaigns.  Through social marketing, the collaboration between environmental non-governmental organizations (NGOs) and industry allowed for the consumer to make informed choices,  potentially contributing to the conservation of marine biodiversity.

Ecolabeling
Ecolabeling programs evaluate the production process with environmental standards set by an independent third party. Should the process fulfill the specific requirements, the producer or marketer may purchase a license to use an ecolabel in its marketing. This label allows the consumer to know that the product was produced sustainably.  Labeling is not only an effective regulatory tool in encouraging consumers to make environmentally friendly choices,  but it also provides a financial benefit to producers. In 1996 the Marine Stewardship Council (MSC)  implemented the first certification program Since then, they have not only made a distinct effort to maintain the health of ecosystems, but they have also contributed to more financial success for producers. For instance, once the American Albacore Fishing Association had its tuna certified to the MSC standard, they were able to obtain premium prices for their product.  For the small fishing community in Bonita, California, certification allowed them to sell direct, as opposed to depending on the instability on the dock.  They were able to make a profit of $2,260 rather than $1,700 per tonne.  More companies and organizations are choosing to use environmentally sustainable production, such as ecolabeling, to gain a greater market share and higher profits.

Awareness Campaigns
Awareness campaigns focus on educating the public and encouraging them to purchase products that consider the vitality of marine species. They do so through boycotts of certain species and products as well as through seafood guides. Seafood guides highlight which species are acceptable to consume and which are not based on their environmental impact.  Guides are typically constructed into three categories, some using the analogy of a traffic light's colours: red, yellow, and green.  These rankings are based on how the fish responds to fishing pressure, abundance, gear impact, bycatch, and management. Red represents items to avoid, yellow is a good alternative, and green is the best choice.  Several organizations, including the Monterey Bay Aquarium, have developed their own guides or wallet cards to be distributed to the public.

In September 2016, a partnership of Google and Oceana and Skytruth introduced Global Fishing Watch, a website designed to assist citizens of the globe in monitoring fishing activities.

Sustainable Seafood in Africa 
In 2004, the South African Sustainable Seafood Initiative (SASSI) was established as an initiative of the World Wide Fund for Nature (WWF). The main goal was to inform the supply chain about sustainable seafood. In 2018, the four-year project Fish for Good started to guide fisheries in South Africa towards more sustainable fishing practices. In Western Cape, subsidies use to be unfavorable for small-scale fishers internationally, while benefiting large-scale fishers, who are responsible for illegal and overfishing problems. The government has to look at how to help small-scale and commercial fisheries to avoid overfishing and illegal activities on our seas.

Seafood Guide
The Seafood Guide below, made by SeaChoice, highlights which species are best to eat, and which should be avoided based on their management, abundance, and whether they have been caught or farmed in environmentally sustainable ways.  It allows consumers to be informed of their choices and vote with their wallets.

Fishing Methods

There are a wide variety of fishing methods used. Each has its own environment impact that varies on intensity. The table below highlights a fishing method along with its environmental repercussions.

National Oceanic and Atmospheric Administration (NOAA) 
The National Oceanic and Atmospheric Administration (NOAA) is a national government agency that has authority over conservation, marine fisheries, and management. The NOAA has created FishWatch to help guide concerned consumers to sustainable seafood choices. The fisheries in the United States are overseen by the Ten National Standards of the Magnuson–Stevens Fishery Conservation and Management Act. Therefore, the National Standards are protecting the fish population and eliminating overfishing. Along with the Magnuson-Stevens Act, U.S. fisheries are also regulated under the Endangered Species Act and Marine Mammal Act.

The NOAA fisheries service has started using aquaculture to produce sustainable seafood. Aquaculture is fish or shellfish farming. The aquaculture fisheries hatch and raise the fish until market size. By using aquaculture the wild fish will be able to repopulate without the threat of overfishing. The aquaculture fish have a variety of uses including: food, nutritional, and pharmaceutical. Two types of aquaculture exist. Marine aquaculture farms the fish species that live in the ocean and fresh water aquaculture is the fish species that live in freshwater. NOAA is focusing on an alternative seafood source to help repopulate and save the ocean's ecosystems.

Sustainable Seafood Organisations

Aquaculture Stewardship Council 
The Aquaculture Stewardship Council (ASC) is an independent non-profit organisation and labelling organization that establishes protocol on farmed seafood while ensuring sustainable aquaculture. The ASC provides producers with a certification of environmental sustainability and social responsibility. The Aquaculture Stewardship Council was founded in 2009 by the World Wide Fund for Nature (WWF) and the Dutch Sustainable Trade Initiative (IDH).

Marine Stewardship Council (MSC)
The Marine Stewardship Council is a global non-profit organization looking to conserve the oceans. Their mission is to use a combination of certified fisheries and ecolabeling to make people aware of how important it is to preserve our oceans. The MSC works with fisheries, scientists, seafood companies, conservation groups and the public to encourage environmentally friendly seafood choices. The two main ways the MSC regulates sustainable seafood is by setting standards for certified fisheries and ecolabeling.

The certified fisheries are judged on the three standards the MSC provides. The MSC, however, does not certify the fisheries.  They are certified by a third party system to remove any bias. The standards were created to decrease overfishing and maintain healthy ecosystems.
The three standards are:
 Maintaining Sustainable Fish Stocks
 The fishery may not overexploit any of its resources.
 Environmental Impact
 Each fishery is judged on the amount of environmental impact they contribute to the ocean. The fishery may not use any form of fishing that destroys the structure, productivity, function, or diversity of the ecosystem.
 Effective Management
Not only does the fishery have to follow the two other MSC standards, but they also have to follow all local, national, and international laws.

Once a fishery has been reviewed and certified, their certification lasts for five years. In that five years, the fishery will be inspected and held to the environmental standards of the MSC. After the five years have passed, the fishery will have to go through the approval process again.

The second way the MSC regulates seafood to the public is by using their ecolabel. The ecolabel on seafood products guarantees the seafood has come from a sustainable source and certified fishery. The ecolabel can be found around the world. The consumer can feel good about buying seafood with a MSC ecolabel.

Before a seafood product can carry the MSC eco-label, the fishery must acquire the MSC Fisheries certification. Additionally,  all companies in the supply chain that take ownership of the product including distributors, wholesalers, manufacturers, pack houses, traders, retailers, catering organizations and restaurants must acquire the MSC Chain of Custody Certification.

Criticism of the Marine Stewardship Council 

Critics condemn the Marine Stewardship Council for certifying specific fisheries that may be in trouble, harmful to the environment, or where there is a lack of information available. For example, the Antarctic toothfish fishery in the Ross Sea was awarded an MSC label, despite a lack of basic information on the stock itself. A Marine Policy study that analyzed the stocks of MSC fisheries found that 31% of the stocks were overfished, and 11% did not have suitable information available.

Richard Page, a Greenpeace oceans campaigner, stated "I will go as far as to say consumers are being duped. They think they are buying fish that are sustainable and can eat them with a clean conscience."

Friend of the Sea

Friend of the Sea is currently a project of the World Sustainability Organization, an international trademark registered with humanitarian and environmental conservation mission.

It was founded by Dr. Paolo Bay who started the sustainable seafood movement in Europe. The certified fisheries are audited by International Organization for Standardization. The criteria to become a certified fishery is:

 The fish stock may not be overexploited
 No habitat destruction
 No bycatch of endangered species
 Must follow all laws and regulations
 Reduction of the carbon footprint
Social accountability

The Friend of the Sea also participate in the certification of aquaculture farms. The establishment of aquaculture helps reduce the number of wild species caught. The criteria of aquaculture is:

 There is no environmental impact where the farm is placed
 Must follow all waste water guidelines
 A very low percentage of escapes
 No genetically modified organisms, growth hormones
Use of antibiotics only if it is necessary
 Reduction of the carbon footprint
Social accountability

In 2004, aquaculture accounted for 32% of the total production of fish. Aquaculture is becoming more popular with an 8% rise per year in the last 30 years.

Chefs and restaurants
Due to growing public concern about overfishing, many seafood restaurants have begun to offer more sustainable seafood options, with some restaurants specializing in sustainable seafood, exemplified by Miya's, a restaurant headed by chef Bun Lai, the first sushi restaurant to specialize in sustainable seafood and a 2016 White House Champions of Change for Sustainable Seafood recipient. Today, there are sustainable sushi restaurants throughout the U.S., Canada, and England, and many more sustainable seafood restaurants in general. Due to eco-labeling, seafood guides, traceability schemes, sourcing policies, and awareness initiatives there are more chefs and restaurants involved in the sustainable seafood movement than ever before.

The rising "trash fish" trend of expanding the species of popular seafood consumption, is another way chef's and restaurants are supporting sustainable seafood. NOAA approximates 20,000 species of seafood in the world and most of them edible. Ten species account for 86% of seafood consumption in the United States, chefs and restaurants engaging in the trash fish trend are looking to increase the amount of species consumed. The desired outcome is to decrease overfishing and revitalize populations of the more popular fish and redirect the attention to more sustainable species.

Organizations such as Seafood Choices Alliance have helped educate chefs about the choices they make in order to encourage more chefs and restaurants to offer sustainable options. This is in line with the strict international standards set by 'Eco Friendly Chef' www.ecofriendlychef.com and 'Eco Friendly Approved' www.EcoFriendlyApproved.com in association with Oceans 5. www.oceans-5.com

Advisory lists

 Sustainable fish by region

See also
 Environmental Defense Fund
 Fisheries Law Centre 
 List of seafoods
 Marine Stewardship Council
 One Fish, Two Fish, Crawfish, Bluefish (book)
 List of harvested aquatic animals by weight
 Sea Fish Industry Authority
 Seafood Choices Alliance
 Seafood Watch
 Ocean Outcomes
 Overfishing
 Fisheries management 
 Fisheries science 
 Fisheries law 
 Illegal, unreported and unregulated fishing

References

Further reading

External links
GoodFish Project - Australia's Sustainable Seafood Guide
InSeason Fish A sustainable seafood guide for India
 David Suzuki Foundation: Choosing Sustainable Seafood
 FishSource
Smithsonian's Ocean Portal Sustainable seafood section
Seafood Watch
SeaChoice
FishChoice
Ocean Wise
Ocean Outcomes

Seafood
.
Sustainable food system